This is a list of breweries in Ohio.

, there were 366 breweries in operation in Ohio, producing the fifth most beer in the United States.  Those breweries support about 83,000 jobs, with a combined economic impact of $10 billion. Each job created in a brewery in the state is estimated to impact 45 additional jobs in agriculture, retail, business services and distribution.

Breweries

Northeast Ohio
 5 Barrel Bullet Brewing – New Philadelphia
 8th Day Brewing - Chagrin Falls
 17th State Brewing Company – Mentor
Aeonian Brewing Co. - Alliance 
Akronym Brewing – Akron
 Avon Brewing Company – Avon 
 Bad Tom Smith Brewing – Cleveland
Bascule Brewing Company. – Lorain
Bell Tower Brewing - Kent
Belmont Brewerks - Martins Ferry
Biker Brewhouse – Austintown
 Birdfish Brewing Company – Columbiana
Blue Heron Brewing – Medina
Blue Monkey Brewing Company – North Royalton
Bookhouse Brewing Company – Cleveland
 Boss Dog Brewing Company – Cleveland Heights
 BottleHouse Brewery And Meadery – Cleveland Heights
 Breaking Point Brewery – Cleveland Heights
The Brew Kettle – Amherst
 The Brew Kettle – Strongsville
 BrewLounge Beer - Columbiana
 Brick and Barrel Brewery – Cleveland
Brighten Brewing Co. - Copley
Broadview Brewing Co. - Broadview Heights
Bummin' Beaver Brewing - Chagrin Falls
 Butcher and the Brewer (Cleveland Brewing Company) – Cleveland
 Canton Brewing Company – Canton 
 Cleveland Brewery – Cleveland
Cloven Hoof Brewing Company – Ashtabula
Clubhouse Brewing Company – Warren
Codex Brewing –  North Canton
 Collision Bend Brewing Company – Cleveland
 Cornerstone Brewing Company – Berea
Crooked Pecker Brewing Company – Chagrin Falls
 Double Wing Brewery – Madison
Dungeon  Hollow Brewing – Bloomingdale
 Earlybird Brewing – Cleveland 
Eighty-Three Brewing – Akron
 Fat Head's Brewery and Beerhall – Middleburg Heights
 Fat Head's Brewery and Saloon – North Olmsted
 Fat Head's Brewery – Canton
 Forest City Brewery  – Cleveland 
Garrett's Mill Brewing Company – Garrettsville
Ghost Tree Brewing - Amherst
 Goldhorn Brewery – Cleveland
GOTL Brewing Company – Geneva-on-the-Lake
 Great Lakes Brewing Company – Cleveland
Greene Eagle Winery / Brewery – Cortland
 Hansa Haus Brewery  – Cleveland
Happy Street Bru Werks - Mt. Vernon
Hasseman Brewing Company – Coshocton
Headtrip Brewing Company – Stow
Hightower Brewing Company – Rayland
HiHO Brewing Co. –  Cuyahoga Falls
 Hofbrauhaus – Cleveland
Hoodletown Brewing Company – Dover
Hop Brother's Brewing - North Ridgeville
 Hoppin' Frog Brewery – Akron
 Hoppy Dude Brews - Hinckley
Hop Tree Brewing Company – Hudson
Ignite Brewing Company – Barberton
Immigrant Son Brewing Co. - Lakewood
 JAFB Wooster Brewery – Wooster
Jilbert Winery / Brewery – Valley City
 Jolly Scholar Brewery – Cleveland
 Lager Heads Brewing Company – Medina
Lake Milton Brewing Co. - Lake Milton
 Laxton Hollow Brewing Works  – Lexington
 Lil Paws Brewery & Winery – Lake Milton
Lock 15 Brewing – Akron
 Lockport Brewery – Bolivar
 Lucky Owl Brewing – Bainbridge
MAD Brewing Company - Medina
 MadCap Brewing Company – Kent
Magic City Brewing Company – Akron
Main Sail Brewery (Atwood Yacht Club) – Sherrodsville
 Maize Valley Brewery – Hartville 
 Market Garden Brewery – Cleveland
 Masthead Brewing Company – Cleveland
 McArthur's Brew House – Cuyahoga Falls
 Medina Brewing Company – Medina
 Meniru Meadery & Brewery – Canton 
 Mentor Brewing Company - Mentor 
 Millersburg Brewing Company – Millersburg
Missing Falls Brewing Company – Akron
Missing Mountain Brewing Company – Cuyahoga Falls
Modern Methods Brewing Company – Warren
Moe's Tavern Brewing – Cleveland
Monzula Farm Brewery (22 Vineyard) – Cadiz
Mount Vernon Brewing Company - Mount Vernon
 Mucky Duck Brewery – Akron
 Muskellunge Brewing Company – Canton
 Nano Brew Cleveland – Cleveland
 New Berlin Brewing Company - N. Canton
 Noble Beast Brewery – Cleveland
Noble Creature Cask House – Youngstown
North Water Brewing – Kent
 Numbers Brewing Company – Lisbon
 Ohio Brewing Company – Cuyahoga Falls
 Paladin Brewing Company – Austintown
 Paradigm Shift Brewing – Massillon
 Penguin City Brewing - Youngstown
 Phoenix Brewing Company – Mansfield
Planted Flag Brewing – Medina
 Platform Beer Company – Cleveland
 Pulpo Beer Company - Willougby
 R. Shea Brewing Company – Akron 
 Railroad Brewing Company – Avon
 Rocky River Brewing Company – Rocky River
 Royal Docks Brewing Company – Cantonel
 Sandy Springs Brewing Company – Minerva
 Saucy Brew Works  – Cleveland
 Schnitz Ale Brewery – Parma
 Sibling Reverly Brewing – Westlake
Southern Tier Brewing Company – Cleveland
 Spider Monkey Brewing – North Canton 
 Terrestrial Brewing Company – Cleveland
 Thirsty Dog Brewing Company – Akron
 Two Monks Brewing Company – Akron
Unhitched Brewing Company – Louisville
Uniontown Brewing Company – Ashland
Unplugged Brewing Co. - Elyria
 Wadsworth Brewing Company – Wadsworth
Wooly Pig Farm Brewery – Fresno
 Working Class Brewery – Cleveland
Wrecking Crew Brewing Company – Medina
ZZ's Big Top – Avon

Southwest Ohio
 13 Below Brewing Company – Cincinnati
16 Lots Brewing Company – Mason
Alematic Artisan Ales – Huber Heights
Bad Tom Smith Brewing – Cincinnati
Bardwell Winery and Brewery – Mt. Orb
Big Ash Brewing – Cincinnati
Bock Family Brewing - Centerville
Branch and Bone Artisan Ales – Dayton
 Brausch Brewing  – Wilmington
Briar Brown Brewing Company – Arcanum
Brink Brewing Company – Cincinnati
Bushrod Brew Works - Eaton
 Carillon Brewing Company – Dayton
Cartridge Brewing Company – Maineville
 Cellar Dweller Brewery – Morrow
 Christian Moerlein Brewing Co. – Cincinnati 
Cincy Brewing Company – Lockland
The Common Beer Company – Mason
 Crooked Handle Brewing Co. – Springboro & Piqua
 The Dayton Beer Company – Dayton
Dead Low Brewing – Cincinnati
Devil Wind Brewing Company – Xenia
 DogBerry Brewing LLC – West Chester
 Eudora Brewing Company – Kettering
 Fibonacci Brewing Company – Cincinnati
 Fifth Street Brewpub Co-op – Dayton
 Fifty West Brewing Company – Cincinnati
Figleaf Brewing Company – Middletown
Fretboard Brewing Company – Cincinnati
 Grainworks Brewing Company – West Chester
 Hairless Hare Brewery – Vandalia
Happy 2 Brewery – Cincinnati
Heavier Than Air Brewing Company – Centerville
HighGrain Brewing Company – Silverton
 Hudepohl Brewing Company – Cincinnati 
Humble Monk Brewing – Cincinnati
Karrikin Spirits – Fairfax
 Listermann Brewing Company/Triple Digit Brewing Company – Cincinnati
Little Miami Brewing Company – Milford
 Lock 27 Brewing – Centerville
Loose Ends Brewing - Centerville
 Lucky Star Brewery – Miamisburg
 MadTree Brewing Company – Cincinnati
March First Brewing Company – Cincinnati
 Moerlein Lager House – Cincinnati
Mother Stewart's Brewing Company – Springfield
 Mt. Carmel Brewing Company – Cincinnati
 Municipal Brew Works  – Hamilton
Narrow Path Brewing Company – Loveland
N.E.W. Ales Brewing – Middletown
 Nine Giant Brewing  – Cincinnati 
Northern Row Brewery – Cincinnati
Nowhere In Particular Cabinet of Curiosity – Kettering
Off Track Brewing – Cincinnati
Paradise Brewing Company – Cincinnati
 Pinups and Pints – Medway
Rhinegeist Brewery – Cincinnati
Rolling Mill Brewing Company – Middletown
 Samuel Adams Brewing Company – Cincinnati
 Sonder Brewing – Mason  
 Sons of Toil Brewing Company – Mt. Orb
 Star City Brewing Company – Miamisburg
 Streetside Brewing Company  – Cincinnati
Swine City Brewing Company – Cincinnati
 Taft's Ale House – Cincinnati
Taft's Brewpourium – Cincinnati
Trail Town Brewing - Yellow Springs
 Toxic Brew Co. – Dayton
 Urban Artifact – Cincinnati
The Wandering Griffin – Beavercreek
 Warped Wing Brewing Company – Dayton
 Warped Wing Barrel House – Springboro
West Side Brewing Company – Cincinnati
Wiedemann Brewing Company – Cincinnati
 The Woodburn Brewery  – Cincinnati
 Yellow Springs Brewery – Yellow Springs

Central Ohio

2 Tones Brewing – Whitehall
1487 Brewing - Plain City
Antiques on High – Columbus
Barley's Brewing Co. Ale House No. 1 – Columbus
Brew Brothers – Columbus
 Brewdog Brewing Co  – Canal Winchester
 Buckeye Lake Brewing Company – Buckeye Lake
 Buck's Brewing – Newark
Buzzsaw Brewing - Whitehall
 Columbus Brewing Company – Columbus 
 Combustion Brewing  – Pickerington 
Crafted Culture Brewing – Gahanna 
Crooked Can Brewing – Hilliard
Dalton Union Winery & Brewery – Marysville
DankHouse Brewing Company – Newark
Derive Brewing Co. – Columbus
Double Edge Brewing Company – Lancaster
Earthworks Brewing Company – Heath
Eastside Brewing Company – Reynoldsburg
Edison Brewing Company – Gahanna
Endeavor Brewing Company – Columbus
Forbidden Root Brewing Company – Columbus
Galena Brewing Company – Westerville
Gemut Biergarten – Columbus
 The Granville Brewing Company – Granville
Grove City Brewing – Grove City
Heart State Brewing - Gahanna
Henmick Farm and Brewery - Delaware
Hofbrauhaus – Columbus
 Homestead Beer Company – Heath
Hoof Hearted Brewing Brew Pub – Columbus
 Hoof Hearted Brewing – Marengo
 Ill Mannered Brewing Company – Powell
Jackie O's on Fourth - Columbus
 Knotty Pine Brewing – Columbus
 Land-Grant Brewing Co. – Columbus
 Loose Rail Brewing  – Canal Winchester
 The Lot Beer Co. – Granville
 Nocterra Brewing Company – Powell
North High Brewing – Columbus
North High Brewing – Dublin
 Nostalgia Brewing Company – Gahanna
Old Dog Alehouse – Delaware
 Olentangy River Brewing Company – Lewis Center
Outerbelt Brewing – Carroll
Parsons North Brewing Company – Columbus
Platform Brewing  – Columbus
Pretentious Barrel House – Columbus
Random Precision Brewing Company – Columbus
Rhetoric Brewing Company- Richwood
 Restoration Brew Worx – Delaware
 Rockmill Brewery – Lancaster
Saucy Brew Works – Columbus
 Seventh Son Brewing Co. – Columbus
 Sideswipe Brewing Company – Columbus
 Smokehouse House Brewing Co. – Columbus
Somewhere in Particular – Columbus
 Staas Brewing – Delaware
Stein Brewing Company – Mt. Vernon
 Temperance Row Brewing Co. – Westerville
 Three Tigers Brewing  – Granville
Trek Brewing Company – Newark
 Wolf's Ridge Brewing – Columbus
 Zaftig Brewing Company – Worthington
Zaftig Brewing Company – Columbus

Southeast Ohio
Belmont Brewerks - Martins Ferry
Brewery 33 – Logan
Devil's Kettle Brewing – Athens
Fifty West Brewing Company – Chillicothe
Jackie O's – Athens
 Little Fish Brewing Company – Athens 
 Maple Lawn Brewery  – Pomeroy
 Marietta Brewing Company – Marietta
 Old Bridge Brewing Company – McConnelsville
Old Capital Brewing - Chillicothe
 Old Mill Craft Beer – Bidwell
 Portsmouth Brewing Company – Portsmouth
Sixth Sense Brewing Company – Jackson
 Southside Brewing Company  – Cambridge
 Weasel Boy Brewing Company – Zanesville
Y Bridge Brewing Company – Zanesville

Northwest Ohio
 1803 Brewing – Galion
1820 Brewing - Kalida
4kd Crick Brewing Company – Defiance
60cc Brewing - Toledo
Arrogant Goat Brewing - Bucyrus
Aistear Brewing - Bowling Green
Arlyn's Good Beer – Bowling Green
Bait House Brewing Company – Sandusky
 Black Frog Brewing – Toledo 
 Bowling Green Beer Works – Bowling Green
Briar Brown Brewing Company – Arcanum
Buffalo Rock Brewing - Waterville
Carey Brewing Station - Carey
 Catawba Island Brewing Company – Port Clinton
Drop Tine Winery and Tap House – Montpelier
Earnest Brew Works – Toledo
Endless Pint Brewing Company – Versailles
 Father John's Brewing Company – Bryan
 Findlay Brewing Company – Findlay
 Flatrock Brewing Co. – Napoleon
Funky Turtle Brewing – Toledo
Gongoozlers Brewing Company – New Bremen
 Great Black Swamp Brewing Company – Toledo 
Inside the Five Brewing Company – Sylvania
Juniper Brewing Co. - Bowling Green
Kelley's Island Brewing Company – Kelley's Island
Laird Arcade Brewery – Tiffin
Lake Rat Brewing – Celina
Marion Brewing Co. – Marion
 Maumee Bay Brewing Company – Toledo
Modcraft Brewing - Findlay
 Moeller's Brew Barn – Maria Stein
Moeller's Brew Barn Troy – Troy
 Neon Groundhog Brewing – Grand Rapids  
 North River Brewing  – Wauseon
Paradune Brewery and Taproom – Huntsville
Patron Saints Brewing Company – Toledo
 Put-in-Bay Brewing Company – South Bass Island
Roundhouse Depot Brewing Company – Bellefontaine
Second Crossing Brewing – Rockford
Tailspin Brewing Company – Coldwater
The Tiffin Brewery – Tiffin
Twin Oasts Brewing Company – Port Clinton
Two Bandits Brewing Company – Hicksville
Urban Woody Brewery – Fostoria
Upside Brewing – Sylvania
White Shutter Winery & Brewery – Nevada
Wild Side Brewing Company – Grand Rapids

Closed breweries
 3 Points Brewing – Cincinnati
 Actual Brewing Company – Columbus
Aqueduct Brewing Company – Akron - opened in 2014 closed 2019
Barrelhead Brewing Company—Over-The-Rhine/Cincinnati
Black Box Brewing Company - Westlake - opened in 1995 closed in 2017
Black Cloister Brewing Company – Toledo - opened in 2015 closed 2019
 Blank Slate Brewing Company – Cincinnati – opened in 2012, closed in 2017.
Brick Oven Brew Pub – Akron - opened in 2014, closed in 2021
 BRIM Kitchen & Brewery – Willoughby - opened in 2017 closed in 2020
Buckeye Brewing Company (Tap Stack) – Cleveland
 Chardon BrewWorks – Chardon – oprnened in 2010 closed in 2017
Dayton Beer Company – Kettering – opened in 2012 closed in 2017
Eldridge & Fiske Brewery – Lithopolis
Elevator Brewing Co. - Columbus
 Euclid Brewing Company – Euclid – opened in 2016 closed in 2017
Four String Brewing Co. – Columbus – opened in 2011 closed in 2018
Franklin Brewing Company – Elyria
Gordon Biersch Brewing – Columbus - opened in 2001 closed in 2020
Indigo Imp Brewing Company – Cleveland – opened in 2009 closed in 2015
Kindred Brewing – Gahanna – opened in 2016 closed in 2019 (location now Crafted Culture)
Lineage Brewing Co. – Columbus 
Little Mountain Brewing Company – Mentor – opened in 2010 closed in 2016
Multiple Brewing – Nelsonville - opened in 2016 closed in 2019 (became Nostalgia at old Pigskin location)
Neil House Brewing – Columbus 
Old Firehouse Brewery – Williamsburg 
 Pigskin Brewing Co – Gahanna – opened in 2015 closed in 2018
Portside Distillery and Brewery – Cleveland  – opened in 2015, closed in 2017.
Pour Boys' Brew House – Washington Court House – opened in 2016 closed in 2017
 Quarter Barrel Brewery & Pub – Oxford – opened 2018 closed in 2019
Queen City Brewery Company – Cincinnati – closed in 2019
RAM Restaurant & Brewery – Columbus – opened in 2016 closed in 2018
RAM Restaurant & Brewery – Dublin - opened in 2017 closed in 2019
Rivertown Brewing and Barrel House – Monroe
Rock Bottom BC – Cincinnati - opened in 1996 closed in 2020
 Rust Belt Brewing Company – Youngstown Permanently closed per Google
Scenic Brewing Company – Canton – opened in 2015 closed in 2017
Shale Brewing - N. Canton
SIP Local Brewery – Columbus
Sojourners Brewstillery – Centerville
Tap and Screw Brewery – Cincinnati – opened in 2014 closed in 2018
Thirsty Dog—Dayton/Centerville
Trailhead Brewing Company – Akron – opened in 2013 closed in 2015
Twenty Nine Brewpub – Marion – opened in 2015 closed due to fire in 2019
Willoughby Brewing Company – Willoughby
Zauber Brewing Company – Columbus – opened in 2011 closed in 2017

See also 
 Beer in the United States
 List of breweries in the United States
 List of defunct breweries in the United States
 List of microbreweries

References

External links
 Ohio Beer Guide: Ohio Breweries

Ohio
Breweries